Sverresborg (Norwegian:Sverresborg i Trondheim) or Sverre Sigurdsson's castle (Kong Sverres borg) was a fort and residence built in the medieval city of Nidaros (later Trondheim) by King Sverre Sigurdsson.  The fortification was built in support of Sverre Sigurdsson's  struggle against his rival King Magnus Erlingsson to claim the throne of Norway. The site now forms part of the Sverresborg Trøndelag Folk Museum, an open-air museum for the region of Trøndelag.

Location
Defense of the city of Trondheim and the location of Sverresborg was based on three key topographical features:
The city is located on a peninsula bordered on the east and south by the river Nidelva and on the north by the Trondheimsfjord 
The neck connecting the peninsula to the mainland was quite narrow and could be easily fortified 
A glacially-carved-rock hill just to the south dominates the city and provides an easily fortified site (location of Sverresborg)

Heklungs War
In 1177, Sverre Sigurdsson, who would later rule as king of Norway from 1184-1202, led the rebel Birkebeiner (Birkebeinerne) forces to Trøndelag where Sverre was hailed as king at Øretinget, the Thing (assembly) for Trøndelag. This was an important symbolic event as new Norwegian kings traditionally had been elected there. After this, the Birkebeins moved south and wintered in Østerdalen. The next spring, the Birkebeins returned to Trøndelag, attacking the city of Nidaros (now Trondheim). Defeated, they fled south until they met and beat the army of reigning King Magnus Erlingsson in Ringerike. Encouraged, the Birkebeins again moved north to Trøndelag and remained in Nidaros during the winter of 1178.

During the spring of 1179, Magnus arrived with his army. The two armies met on June 19 in the Battle of Kalvskinnet (Slaget på Kalvskinnet) with the result being a clear victory for Sverre, securing his grip on Trøndelag.

Magnus Erlingsson again attacked Trøndelag in the spring of 1180. Sverre held Trøndelag from Nidaros, which was then protected by a wooden palisades extending from the river to the fjord across the neck of the peninsula connecting the town to the mainland. In the Battle of Ilevollene (Slaget på Ilevollene), just outside Nidaros, the Heklungs were again defeated.

The two forces met again in 1181 in the Battle of Nordnes (Slaget i Bergen 1181) which resulted in a minor victory for Sverre. But Magnus exploited Sverre’s absence from Trøndelag when in November he raided and burned the Birkebeiner fleet located there. Sverre was forced to return or risk losing his one secure foothold. During the summer of 1182, Magnus made an attempt to take Nidaros by siege, but was repulsed with grave losses when the Birkebeins launched a surprise night attack.

Castle construction
In the winter of 1182/1183 Sverre initiated construction of Sverresborg (one of the earliest Norwegian fortresses) to provide him a more secure and more easily defended base from which reside and operate from. The location selected was easily fortified, hard to approach, and could be defended by a small force. The stone for the fortification was available only 0.6 km away in the quarry which had been used for construction the cathedral at Nidaros. Since the Archbishop of Nidaros, who had aligned with King Magnus, was in exile in England from 1180 to 1183, the stonemasons were also available. Work proceeded quickly, and Sverre, along with a detachment of his men, moved out to the castle during Lent in 1183.

The sea Battle of Fimreite in 1184 proved to be final struggle between the Birkebeins and the Heklunger; King Magnus drowned. King Sverre, after a six years of struggle, became the uncontested king of Norway. But the peace was not to last for long.

Bagler war
In 1188 the town of Nidaros, which had been vacated by King Sverre’s men, was attacked. His opposition stormed into the city and a bloodbath followed. The wooden fortress was torn down and the castle burnt and left in ruins. It is not known precisely when it was restored, but the Sverris saga indicates the castle had been restored by 1197. King Sverre died in Bergen on 8 March 1202. Sverresborg is last mentioned in the time of King Sverre’s paternal grandson, King Haakon Haakonson in 1263, when he allowed the walls of Sverresborg to be broken down.

Sverresborg Trøndelag Folk Museum
In 1914 the area surrounding the ruins of King Sverre's medieval castle was appropriated for the site of the new open-air museum. Today the castle ruins are adjoining the Sverresborg Trøndelag Folk Museum. The museum had started in 1909, when a group of enthusiasts decided to gather buildings and objects characteristic of the area for purposes of preservation.  The area around the fortress ruins was set aside for purposes of building a museum and the collection has grown steadily since then. Sverresborg Trøndelag Folk Museum is one of the largest cultural history museums in Norway. There are more than 60 buildings on the site now, covering a broad ethnological range.

See also
Civil war era in Norway

References

Other sources
Gjerset, Knut   (1915) History of the Norwegian People  (The MacMillan Company)
Kavli, Guthorm (1987) Norges festninger  (Universitetsforlaget)  
Koht, Halvdan (1995)   Sverresoga   (Oslo: Det Norske Samlaget)  
Krag, Claus (2005)  Sverre – Norges største middelalderkonge (Oslo: H. Aschehoug & Co)

External links
 Official website
Sverresborg Trøndelag Folk Museum

Castles in Norway
Military installations in Trondheim
Forts in Norway
Museums in Trondheim
Open-air museums in Norway
Photography archives in Norway
Culture in Trondheim